Melissa Gurney (born June 24, 1969) is a retired professional tennis player from the U.S.

Career
Gurney won the US National 18 Hardcourts in 1984 and was ranked No. 2 nationally in the Girls' 16 singles in 1983. She turned professional in 1984 and joined the WTA Tour. In 1986, she won two consecutive singles titles, the Northern California Open and the Southern California Open. She reached a career-high ranking of No. 17 on March 30, 1987. She posted career victories over Andrea Jaeger, Dianne Balestrat, Mary Joe Fernández, Rosie Casals, and Kathy Jordan. She retired in 1995.

WTA career finals

Singles: 4 (2 titles, 2 runner-ups)

References

External links
 
 

1969 births
Living people
American female tennis players
Sportspeople from Los Angeles County, California
Tennis people from California
People from Palos Verdes, California